Drewery is a surname. Notable people with the surname include:

Corinne Drewery (born 1959), British singer-songwriter and fashion designer
Edward Drewery (1851–1940), British-born Canadian brewer and politician

See also
Drewry (surname)